Gleti is a moon goddess of the Fon people from the Kingdom of Dahomey, situated in what is now Benin.

In Dahomey mythology, she is the mother of all the stars. An eclipse is caused by the shadow of the moon's husband crossing her face.

See also
List of lunar deities
Nix (moon)

References

Dahomean goddesses

Lunar goddesses
Voodoo goddesses